The 1899 VFL season was the third season of the Victorian Football League (VFL), the highest level senior Australian rules football competition in Victoria. The season featured eight clubs, ran from 13 May until 16 September, and comprised a 14-game home-and-away season followed by a finals series featuring all eight clubs.

The premiership was won by the Fitzroy Football Club for the second time and second time consecutively, after it defeated  by one point in the 1899 VFL Grand Final.

Premiership season
In 1899, the VFL competition consisted of eight teams of 18 on-the-field players each, with no "reserves" (although any of the 18 players who had left the playing field for any reason could later resume their place on the field at any time during the match).

Each team played each other twice in a home-and-away season of 14 rounds.

Once the 14 round home-and-away season had finished, the 1899 VFL Premiers were determined by the specific format and conventions of the 1898 VFL Premiership System.

Round 1

Round 2

Round 3

Round 4

Round 5

Round 6

Round 7

Round 8

Round 9

Round 10

Round 11

Round 12

Round 13

Round 14

Win/Loss table

{|  class="wikitable sortable" style="font-size:85%; text-align:center; width:90%"
|- valign="top"
!valign="middle"| Team
! 1
! 2
! 3
! 4
! 5
! 6
! 7
! 8
! 9
! 10
! 11
! 12
! 13
! 14
! SR1
! SR2
! SR3
! GF
!valign="middle"| Ladder
|-
|align="left"| 
|style="background:#FFCFCF;"|SM-55
|style="background:#FFCFCF;"|Geel-25
|style="background:#FFCFCF;"|Melb-26
|style="background:#FFCFCF;"|Ess-39
|style="background:#FFCFCF;"|Coll-31
| style="background:#cfc;"|StK+2
|style="background:#FFCFCF;"|Fit-32
| style="background:#cfc;"|SM+19
|style="background:#FFCFCF;"|Geel-30
|style="background:#FFCFCF;"|Melb-32
|style="background:#FFCFCF;"|Ess-31
|style="background:#FFCFCF;"|Coll-16
| style="background:#cfc;"|StK+39
|style="background:#FFCFCF;"|Fit-23
|style="background:#FFCFCF;"|Fit-1
|style="background:#FFCFCF;"|Coll-21
| style="background:#cfc;"|Melb+25
| X 
| style="text-align:center;"|7
|-
|align="left"| 
|style="background:#FFCFCF;"|Geel-27
|style="background:#FFCFCF;"|Melb-27
| style="background:#cfc;"|StK+69
| style="background:#cfc;"|SM+7
| style="background:#cfc;"|Carl+31
|style="background:#FFCFCF;"|Fit-22
| style="background:#cfc;"|Ess+20
|style="background:#FFCFCF;"|Geel-41
| style="background:#cfc;"|Melb+8
| style="background:#cfc;"|StK+83
| style="background:#cfc;"|SM+3
| style="background:#cfc;"|Carl+16
| style="background:#cfc;"|Fit+12
|style="background:#cfc;"|Ess+22
|style="background:#cfc;"|Melb+20
|style="background:#cfc;"|Carl+21
|style="background:#FFCFCF;"|Fit-14
| X 
| style="text-align:center;"|4
|-
|align="left"| 
|style="background:#FFCFCF;"|Fit-38
| style="background:#cfc;"|StK+46
| style="background:#cfc;"|SM+6
| style="background:#cfc;"|Carl+39
|style="background:#FFCFCF;"|Geel-4
| style="background:#cfc;"|Melb+14
|style="background:#FFCFCF;"|Coll-20
|style="background:#FFCFCF;"|Fit-12
| style="background:#cfc;"|StK+79
| style="background:#cfc;"|SM+16 
| style="background:#cfc;"|Carl+31
| style="background:#cfc;"|Geel+24
| style="background:#cfc;"|Melb+13
|style="background:#FFCFCF;" |Coll-22
| style="background:#cfc;"|StK+98
|style="background:#FFCFCF;"|Geel-8
|style="background:#FFCFCF;"|SM-15
| X 
| style="text-align:center;"|5
|-
|align="left"| 
| style="background:#cfc;"|Ess+38
| style="background:#cfc;"|SM+4
| style="background:#cfc;"|Geel+24
| style="background:#cfc;"|StK+23
|style="background:#FFCFCF;"|Melb-11
| style="background:#cfc;"|Coll+22
| style="background:#cfc;"|Carl+32
| style="background:#cfc;"|Ess+12
| style="background:#cfc;"|SM+33
|style="background:#FFCFCF;"|Geel-35
| style="background:#cfc;"|StK+54
| style="background:#cfc;"|Melb+8
|style="background:#FFCFCF;"|Coll-12
| style="background:#cfc;"|Carl+23
| style="background:#cfc;"|Carl+1
| style="background:#cfc;"|Melb+38
| style="background:#cfc;"|Coll+14
| style="background:#cfc;"|SM+1
| style="text-align:center;"|1
|-
|align="left"| 
| style="background:#cfc;"|Coll+27
| style="background:#cfc;"|Carl+25
|style="background:#FFCFCF;"|Fit-24|style="background:#FFCFCF;"|Melb-5
| style="background:#cfc;"|Ess+4|style="background:#FFCFCF;"|SM-16
| style="background:#cfc;"|StK+47
| style="background:#cfc;"|Coll+41
| style="background:#cfc;"|Carl+30| style="background:#cfc;"|Fit+35
| style="background:#cfc;"|Melb+14|style="background:#FFCFCF;"|Ess-24
| style="background:#cfc;"|SM+27| style="background:#cfc;"|StK+117|style="background:#FFCFCF;"|SM-3| style="background:#cfc;"|Ess+8
| style="background:#cfc;"|StK+161| X 
| style="text-align:center;"|3
|-
|align="left"| 
| style="background:#cfc;"|StK+93| style="background:#cfc;"|Coll+27
| style="background:#cfc;"|Carl+26
| style="background:#cfc;"|Geel+5| style="background:#cfc;"|Fit+11|style="background:#FFCFCF;"|Ess-14
| style="background:#cfc;"|SM+7| style="background:#cfc;"|StK+17
|style="background:#FFCFCF;"|Coll-8| style="background:#cfc;"|Carl+32|style="background:#FFCFCF;"|Geel-14
|style="background:#FFCFCF;"|Fit-8
|style="background:#FFCFCF;"|Ess-13|style="background:#FFCFCF;"|SM-7
|style="background:#FFCFCF;"|Coll-20|style="background:#FFCFCF;"|Fit-38
|style="background:#FFCFCF;"|Carl-25
| X 
| style="text-align:center;"|6
|-
|align="left"| 
| style="background:#cfc;"|Carl+55|style="background:#FFCFCF;"|Fit-4|style="background:#FFCFCF;"|Ess-6
|style="background:#FFCFCF;"|Coll-7| style="background:#cfc;"|StK+37
| style="background:#cfc;"|Geel+16|style="background:#FFCFCF;"|Melb-7
|style="background:#FFCFCF;"|Carl-19
|style="background:#FFCFCF;"|Fit-33
|style="background:#FFCFCF;"|Ess-16|style="background:#FFCFCF;"|Coll-3
| style="background:#cfc;"|StK+33|style="background:#FFCFCF;"|Gee-27
| style="background:#cfc;"|Melb+7| style="background:#cfc;"|Geel+3
| style="background:#cfc;"|StK+70
| style="background:#cfc;"|Ess+15|style="background:#FFCFCF;"|Fit-1
| style="text-align:center;"|2|-
|align="left"| 
|style="background:#FFCFCF;"|Melb-93
|style="background:#FFCFCF;"|Ess-46|style="background:#FFCFCF;"|Coll-69
|style="background:#FFCFCF;"|Fit-23
|style="background:#FFCFCF;"|SM-37|style="background:#FFCFCF;"|Carl-2|style="background:#FFCFCF;"|Geel-47|style="background:#FFCFCF;"|Melb-17|style="background:#FFCFCF;"|Ess-79
|style="background:#FFCFCF;"|Coll-83|style="background:#FFCFCF;"|Fit-54|style="background:#FFCFCF;"|SM-33
|style="background:#FFCFCF;"|Carl-39
|style="background:#FFCFCF;"|Geel-117
|style="background:#FFCFCF;"|Ess-98
|style="background:#FFCFCF;"|SM-70'|style="background:#FFCFCF;"|Geel-161
| X 
| style="text-align:center;"|8
|- valign="top"
!valign="middle"| Team
! 1
! 2
! 3
! 4
! 5
! 6
! 7
! 8
! 9
! 10
! 11
! 12
! 13
! 14
! SR1
! SR2
! SR3
! GF
!valign="middle"| Ladder
|}

Bold – Home game
X – Bye
Opponent for round listed above margin

Ladder

Ladder progression
No ladder for finals in 1899.

Finals

Sectional Round 1

Sectional Round 2

Sectional Round 3

Section A Ladder

Section B Ladder

Grand final

Awards
 The 1899 VFL  Premiership team was Fitzroy.
 The VFL's leading goalkicker was Eddy James of Geelong with 31 goals.
 The Argus newspaper's "Player of the Year" was Fitzroy's Pat Hickey.

Notable events
 The VFL reduced the size of its teams from 20 to 18 on-the-field players, with no "reserves". In doing this, the number of followers was reduced from five (four rucks and a rover) to three (two rucks and a rover).
 The third round, Queen's Birthday holiday match, between Collingwood and St Kilda at Victoria Park was held in the morning of Wednesday 24 May 1899.
 Norman "Hackenschmidt" Clark, a footballer with the North Adelaide Football Club in the South Australian Football Association, won the 1899, 130-yard Stawell Gift in eleven and four-fifths seconds, off a handicap of 14 and a half yards. Clark would later play 125 senior games for Carlton (1905–1912), captain-coach VFA team Brighton (1913), and coach Carlton (1914–1918; 1920–1922), Richmond (1919), North Melbourne (1924 and 1931) and St Kilda (1925–1926).
 At half-time of the Round 13 game between Fitzroy and Collingwood, Fitzroy captain Alec Sloan offers Collingwood captain Dick Condon the use of a fresh football, due to the old ball being greasy. Condon declines, and Colingwood win the game 5.7 (37) to 3.7 (25).
 The first seven kicks of the Round 14 game between Carlton and Fitzroy are free kicks awarded by the umpire.
 In the third sectional round, Geelong set records for the highest score in a game, scoring 23.24 (162), and the highest winning margin of 161 points, against St Kilda. These records would both stand for twelve years and twenty years respectively.
 St Kilda's score of 0.1 (1) in the same match set the record for the lowest score in a VFL/AFL game, which has neither been matched nor broken since. Notably, the solitary behind was actually the first score of the match.
 Geelong's Jim McShane kicked 11 goals in the same match against St Kilda, a VFL record that was not equalled until Collingwood's Dick Lee's 11 goals in 1914 and not broken until 1922; this is more impressive considering that McShane was usually a ruckman.
 Warwick Armstrong (6'3", 190 cm), later captain of the Australian Test Cricket team, played in the ruck for the South Melbourne team that lost the 1899 "Grand Final".
 At the end of the 1899 season, in the process of naming his own "champion player", the football correspondent for The Argus ("Old Boy"), selected a team of the best players of the 1899 VFL competition:Backs: Maurie Collins (Essendon), Bill Proudfoot (Collingwood), Peter Burns (Geelong); Halfbacks: Pat Hickey (Fitzroy), George Davidson (South Melbourne), Alf Wood (Melbourne); Centres: Fred Leach (Collingwood), Firth McCallum (Geelong), Harry Wright (Essendon); Wings: Charlie Pannam (Collingwood), Eddie Drohan (Fitzroy), Herb Howson (South Melbourne); Forwards: Bill Jackson (Essendon), Eddy James (Geelong), Charlie Colgan (South Melbourne); Ruck: Mick Pleass (South Melbourne), Frank Hailwood (Collingwood), Joe McShane (Geelong); Rovers: Dick Condon (Collingwood), Bill McSpeerin (Fitzroy), Teddy Rankin (Geelong).From those he considered to be the three best players — that is, Condon, Hickey, and Pleass — he selected Pat Hickey as his "champion player" of the season. ('Old Boy', "Football: A Review of the Season", (Monday, 18 September 1899), p.6).

References

 Rogers, S. & Brown, A., Every Game Ever Played: VFL/AFL Results 1897–1997 (Sixth Edition), Viking Books, (Ringwood), 1998. 
 Ross, J. (ed), 100 Years of Australian Football 1897–1996: The Complete Story of the AFL, All the Big Stories, All the Great Pictures, All the Champions, Every AFL Season Reported'', Viking, (Ringwood), 1996.

External links
 1899 Season – AFL Tables

Australian Football League seasons
VFL season